Maria Papapetros is a Greek psychic and spiritual healer. She has served as a spiritual consultant to individuals within the entertainment industry, law enforcement agencies, world leaders and major financial institutions. She is also involved the movement of bringing the field of parapsychology mainstream.

Early life 
Born on July 20, 1943 in Heraklion, Crete, Greece to parents Chrysa and Vasillios Petropoulos, both of Greek descent and immigrants of Asia Minor. Her father was born in Istanbul in 1895 and her mother in 1912 in Izmir Turkey.

In the media
Papapetros has been a guest on many national television programs, including Late Night with David Letterman, Donnie & Marie, The Maury Povich Show, Entertainment Tonight, Inside Edition and E! Entertainment Television and Fox News. She has also appeared in periodicals such as Vogue, Redbook, Elle, Marie Claire, Glamour and Ellopia Press Magazine USA.

In January 2011, Papapetros partnered with Lifetime Television and their Year Of You promotion, where readers of The Cosmic Lowdown blog on Lifetime’s website could enter for a chance to win a private psychic reading with Papapetros.

Ties to law enforcement
In 1978, Papapetros spoke to law-enforcement officials about the Jim Jones mass-suicide case in Guyana. Papapetros also worked with many of the defectors and survivors at the Human Freedom Foundation, which was set up to help former members of the cult deprogram themselves.

From 1978-1979 she was brought in as a psychic consultant on the Hillside Strangler murders in Los Angeles. In 1992, she consulted with the Harris County Sheriff’s office in Texas regarding Rex Warren Mays, who was later convicted of killing two girls and was subsequently executed in 2002.

Ties to Hollywood
Having worked with numerous celebrities, producers and actors, Papapetros is known by many as “Psychic to the Stars”.<ref name=stars>”Psychic To The Stars,” Houston Chronicle”, July 16, 1992</ref> In addition to film and television projects, Papapetros has acted as a psychic consultant to two of actress Demi Moore’s films, The Butcher's Wife and Ghost. For The Butcher's Wife, she was the first person to receive on-screen credit for an off-screen role as a “psychic consultant.” In addition to Moore, the film’s producer and director were both clients of Papapetros at the time.

Contributions to parapsychology
In 1980, Papapetros participated in a study at UCLA’s Department of Psychology. Conducted by Jan Berlin, it was one of the first controlled investigations of parapsychology

References

External links
Maria Papapetros Website
Maria Papapetros Blog

Parapsychologists
Psychics
Antioch College alumni
People from Heraklion
1943 births
Living people